Katav-Ivanovsk is a town and the administrative center of Katav-Ivanovsky District in Chelyabinsk Oblast, Russia, located on the Katav River (left tributary of the Yuryuzan),  southwest of Chelyabinsk, the administrative center of the oblast. Population:

History
It was founded in 1755 as a settlement around an iron-smelting plant. Town status was granted to it on August 27, 1939.

Administrative and municipal status
Within the framework of administrative divisions, Katav-Ivanovsk serves as the administrative center of Katav-Ivanovsky District. As an administrative division, it is, together with two rural localities, incorporated within Katav-Ivanovsky District as the Town of Katav-Ivanovsk. As a municipal division, the Town of Katav-Ivanovsk is incorporated within Katav-Ivanovsky Municipal District as Katav-Ivanovskoye Urban Settlement.

References

External links

Official website of Katav-Ivanovsk 
Katav-Ivanovsk Business Directory 

Cities and towns in Chelyabinsk Oblast
Ufa Governorate
Populated places established in 1757